The Jersey City YMCA, is located in Bergen Section of Jersey City, Hudson County, New Jersey, United States. The YMCA building was added to the National Register of Historic Places on November 12, 1999. The building is an example of an early twentieth century Renaissance Revival style. Built in 1923, in 1995 the building ceased to be used by the YMCA and was converted into affordable housing.

See also
Bergen-Lafayette
Bergen Section, Jersey City
National Register of Historic Places listings in Hudson County, New Jersey

References

External links
 View of Jersey City YMCA via Google Street View

Sports in Hudson County, New Jersey
History of Jersey City, New Jersey
Buildings and structures in Jersey City, New Jersey
YMCA buildings in the United States
Buildings and structures completed in 1924
Renaissance Revival architecture in New Jersey
Clubhouses on the National Register of Historic Places in New Jersey
National Register of Historic Places in Hudson County, New Jersey
Apartment buildings in Jersey City, New Jersey
New Jersey Register of Historic Places